Bowls South Africa (Bowls SA), (BSA) is the governing body for the sport of bowls in South Africa. Bowls South Africa is responsible for the promotion and development of lawn bowls in South Africa, and is affiliated with the world governing body World Bowls, as well as  SASCOC.

Bowls SA organise tournaments such as men's and women's National Tournament with competition in the main bowls disciplines of fours, pairs and singles, as well as Mixed Pairs Championships. Affiliate member associations (or Districts), alongside associate members and bowling clubs assist with the nurturing and training of potential bowls players.

History
Bowls as a sport began in South Africa around 1882, when the initial bowling green was commissioned. A lawn bowls club was subsequently established in Port Elizabeth at St Georges Park. South African Bowling Association was founded in 1904 as the governing body for the sport of bowls in South Africa. Afterwards, the growth of the women's game led to the establishment of South African Women's Bowling Association in 1935 to control and promote the women's game. The two controlling bodies merged in 1996 to establish Bowls South Africa.

Bowls players

See also
 Sport in South Africa
 1976 World Outdoor Bowls Championship
 Lawn bowls at the Commonwealth Games

References

External links
 Official website
  World Bowls website

Bowls in South Africa
Sports governing bodies in South Africa
1904 establishments in South Africa
Sports organizations established in 1904
Bowling organizations